Keith Matthew Rodden (born March 27, 1981) is an American stock car racing crew chief who will work for Richard Childress Racing as the crew chief for Austin Dillon's No. 3 Chevrolet Camaro ZL1 in the NASCAR Cup Series starting in 2023. He currently works for Chevrolet in their motorsports division. Rodden previously worked as a crew chief in the Cup Series for Chip Ganassi Racing on Jamie McMurray's No. 1 car in 2014 and then for Hendrick Motorsports on Kasey Kahne's No. 5 car from 2015 to 2017.

Racing career

A native of Denver, North Carolina, and a graduate of North Carolina State University, Rodden has worked as an engineer in the NASCAR Sprint Cup Series for Andy Petree Racing, Gillett Evernham Motorsports, Richard Petty Motorsports, Red Bull Racing and Hendrick Motorsports.

In November 2013, Rodden was announced as the new crew chief for Chip Ganassi Racing's No. 1 Chevrolet, starting with the 2014 NASCAR Sprint Cup Series season.

A year later, Rodden was announced as the crew chief for Hendrick Motorsports's No. 5 Chevrolet starting in 2015. Working with Kasey Kahne, the two won the 2017 Brantley Gilbert Big Machine Brickyard 400, though Rodden was replaced by Darian Grubb later in the year.

In July 2020, Rodden substituted for Chad Knaus as crew chief for William Byron on the 24 car for the Super Start Batteries 400. Byron finished the race in 10th position while also leading 27 laps mainly due to a strategy call.

Rodden would later leave Hendrick to work for Chevrolet and General Motors in their motorsports division as part of their NASCAR competition and strategy group. On October 28, 2022, it was announced that Rodden would return to being a crew chief in 2023 as the new crew chief for Richard Childress Racing's No. 3 car, driven by Austin Dillon. He replaced Justin Alexander, who would become RCR's director of vehicle performance.

References

External links
 

Living people
People from Denver, North Carolina
NASCAR crew chiefs
North Carolina State University alumni
1981 births